Huilong is a town of Yingshan County in northeastern Sichuan province, China, situated  northwest of the county seat. , it has one residential community (社区) and 19 villages under its administration.

See also 
 List of township-level divisions of Sichuan

References 

Towns in Sichuan
Nanchong